Filip Raičević (born 2 July 1993) is a Montenegrin footballer who plays for Italian  club Taranto.

Raičević also holds Belgian passport.

Club career
Born in Podgorica, the capital of Montenegro, Raičević started his career at Serbian club FK Partizan.

Lucchese
Raičević was signed by Italian Serie D club Lucchese in February 2014. He followed the club promoted to 2014–15 Lega Pro.

Vicenza
Raičević was signed by Italian Serie B club Vicenza on 22 July 2015 for €50,000 transfer fee, in a 3-year contract, with Niko Bianconi moved to Lucchese in a temporary deal.

On 31 January 2017 Raičević and Cristian Galano were left for Bari in temporary deals from Vicenza, with an obligation to sign them outright. On the same day Giuseppe De Luca and Souleyman Doumbia moved to the Veneto-based club from Bari in temporary basis.

Livorno

Loan to Śląsk Wrocław
On 27 January 2020 he joined Polish club Śląsk Wrocław on loan until the end of the 2019–20 season.

Loan to Ternana
On 3 October 2020 he joined Ternana on loan with an option to buy.

Piacenza
On 4 November 2021, he signed a one-season deal with Piacenza.

International career
Raičević was a player of Montenegro U17 in 2009–10 season. He scored once in 2010 UEFA European Under-17 Championship qualifying round, out of possible 3 matches. He received a call-up from Montenegro under-18 team in 2010–11 season.

He made his senior debut for Montenegro in a March 2016 friendly match against Greece and has, as of October 2020, earned a total of 3 caps, scoring no goals.

References

External links

1993 births
Living people
Footballers from Podgorica
Belgian people of Montenegrin descent
Association football forwards
Montenegrin footballers
Montenegro youth international footballers
Montenegro international footballers
S.S.D. Lucchese 1905 players
L.R. Vicenza players
S.S.C. Bari players
F.C. Pro Vercelli 1892 players
U.S. Livorno 1915 players
Śląsk Wrocław players
Ternana Calcio players
Piacenza Calcio 1919 players
Taranto F.C. 1927 players
Serie D players
Serie B players
Serie C players
Ekstraklasa players
Montenegrin expatriate footballers
Expatriate footballers in Italy
Montenegrin expatriate sportspeople in Italy
Expatriate footballers in Poland
Montenegrin expatriate sportspeople in Poland